Fishaar is a Pakistani television first broadcast on PTV in 1990. It was directed by Ayub Khawar and written by Amjad Islam Amjad.

Synopsis 

A youth oriented drama in which the difficulties and successes of choosing the straight path was presented. It describes the deterioration of youth and several other problems of their due to unemployment and lower education standards.

Cast 

 Qavi Khan
 Samina Peerzada
 Sohail Ahmed
 Mehboob Aalam
 Tahira Wasti
 Tauqeer Nasir
 Abid Kahmiri
 Nauman Ijaz
 Mehmood Aslam
 Natasha Hussain
 Khurshid Shahid
 Arifa Siddiqui
 Naima Khan

References 

Pakistani television series